Glouster is a village in Trimble Township, Athens County, Ohio, United States. The population was 1,791 at the 2010 census. It is close to Burr Oak State Park.

History
Formerly called Sedalia, the present name of Glouster, after Gloucester, England, was adopted in 1886. A post office called Glouster has been in operation since 1887.

Economy
A deep mine is located north of town. The nearby mining pit was recently  closed, with active operations moved to the east of Burr Oak State Park, but the loading station is still at the old site because of the location of the railroad. The Trimble high school and middle school provide some local employment, as does Frog Ranch Foods, and Hocking-Athens-Perry Community Action Programs (HAPCAP). Tourist activity from nearby Burr Oak State Park as well as hunting in various nearby public lands also supports the economy. The village owns its own electrical and water utility, although it purchases the electricity from American Electric Power and the water from the Sunday Creek Water District.

Geography

Glouster is located at  (39.502586, -82.082203), along Sunday Creek.  The village is located entirely within the Sunday Creek watershed, mostly on riparian plains or old stream terraces.

The surrounding area consists of gently rolling hills and large wooded areas, all within the unglaciated Allegheny Plateau. Nearby public and semi-public areas include the Trimble State Wildlife Area, the Sunday Creek State Wildlife Area, the Trimble Community Forest, the Wayne National Forest, and Burr Oak State Park.

Glouster Community Park is located along the west side of Ohio State Route 13, between the highway and Sunday Creek, on the south end of the village.

Transportation
Ohio state highways 13 and 78 both pass through Glouster.  State route 329 begins in adjacent Trimble, Ohio. A through-line of the Norfolk Southern Railway line passes through the community, and also provides services to the nearby Buckingham Coal Company mine.

Demographics

2010 census
As of the census of 2010, there were 1,791 people, 720 households, and 471 families living in the village. The racial makeup of the village was 96.1% White, 1.4% African American, 0.1% Native American, 0.2% Asian, 0.1% from other races, and 2.1% from two or more races. Hispanic or Latino of any race were 0.8% of the population.

There were 720 households, of which 35.6% had children under the age of 18 living with them, 39.4% were married couples living together, 18.2% had a female householder with no husband present, 7.8% had a male householder with no wife present, and 34.6% were non-families. 29.0% of all households were made up of individuals, and 11.9% had someone living alone who was 65 years of age or older. The average household size was 2.49 and the average family size was 3.04.

The median age in the village was 35.8 years. 27.7% of residents were under the age of 18; 8.6% were between the ages of 18 and 24; 26.3% were from 25 to 44; 25.6% were from 45 to 64; and 11.9% were 65 years of age or older. The gender makeup of the village was 47.8% male and 52.2% female.

2000 census
As of the census of 2000, there were 1,972 people, 783 households, and 526 families living in the village. The population density was 1,470.9 people per square mile (568.2/km2). There were 906 housing units at an average density of 675.8 per square mile (261.1/km2). The racial makeup of the village was 95.74% White, 1.37% African American, 0.15% Native American, 0.05% Asian, 0.20% from other races, and 2.48% from two or more races. Hispanic or Latino of any race were 1.06% of the population.

There were 783 households, out of which 35.5% had children under the age of 18 living with them, 43.4% were married couples living together, 17.0% had a female householder with no husband present, and 32.8% were non-families. 28.1% of all households were made up of individuals, and 12.4% had someone living alone who was 65 years of age or older. The average household size was 2.52 and the average family size was 3.08.

In the village, the population was spread out, with 30.3% under the age of 18, 9.4% from 18 to 24, 27.4% from 25 to 44, 20.4% from 45 to 64, and 12.4% who were 65 years of age or older. The median age was 32 years. For every 100 females there were 89.3 males. For every 100 females age 18 and over, there were 84.7 males.

The median income for a household in the village was $23,929, and the median income for a family was $28,800. Males had a median income of $28,854 versus $22,206 for females. The per capita income for the village was $11,837. About 24.2% of families and 28.2% of the population were below the poverty line, including 36.3% of those under age 18 and 21.4% of those age 65 or over.

Public services
The residents of Glouster are served by the Trimble Local School District and Trimble High School.  Glouster has a public library, a branch of the Athens County Public Libraries. The village operates its own utility providing electricity and water to local residents.  Sewage treatment is provided by a plant in nearby Trimble. Hocking-Athens-Perry Community Action Program serves the community by providing jobs, HEAP and PIPP assistance, weatherization of homes, and many other programs and services.

References

Villages in Athens County, Ohio
Villages in Ohio
Coal towns in Ohio
English-American culture in Ohio
1886 establishments in Ohio
Populated places established in 1886